The Witch from the Well is a Big Finish Productions audio drama based on the long-running British science fiction television series Doctor Who.

Plot
In the 17th Century, Mary and the Doctor investigate witches being hunted by The Witch-Prickers.

Cast
The Doctor - Paul McGann
Mary Shelley - Julie Cox
Master John Kincaid - Simon Rouse
Aleister Portillon/Squire Claude Portillon - Andrew Havill
Agnes Bates - Serena Evans
Beatrix - Lisa Kay
Finicia - Alix Wilton Regan
Lucern/Cornet Swallow - Kevin Trainor

External links
The Witch from the Well 

2011 audio plays
Eighth Doctor audio plays
Fiction set in the 1650s